Megan Dodds is an American actress. She played Kate in the 2006 series Not Going Out, alongside Lee Mack and Tim Vine, and has appeared in the series Spooks, House, Detroit 1-8-7, and CSI: NY, and the films Ever After, The Contract, and Chatroom. Her stage work includes having played the title role in the stage production My Name Is Rachel Corrie (2006), which won the London Theatregoers' Choice Award for Best Actress in that year.

Early life
Megan Dodds was born in Sacramento, California. She graduated from Roseville High School in 1988 and then enrolled in a community college, where she was cast as Bananas in John Guare's The House of Blue Leaves. She next went to Juilliard School, where she studied for four years as a member of the Drama Division's Group 24 (1991–1995).

Career
After graduation, Dodds spent two years in Broadway and Off Broadway productions. She left the U.S. for London in 1997 to star in British comedian Ben Elton's play Popcorn. As a result of meeting her future husband, photographer Oliver Pearce, she stayed in London, about which she has said, "I love it here, I really feel like I learn a lot. There’s a lot of variety in terms of work."

Theatre
In Up for Grabs (2006, Wyndham's Theatre, London), Dodds played a technology entrepreneur, co-starring with Madonna as Mindy, Madonna's seductress, where she was described as combining "sexiness and solitude".

Dodds won the London Theatregoers' Choice Award for Best Actress in 2007 for the one woman show My Name Is Rachel Corrie, about an activist killed by an Israeli bulldozer during a 2003 demonstration in Gaza. The show opened at the Royal Court Theatre in London. A move was planned to the New York Theatre Workshop, but it was cancelled in Fall 2005—amid rumors that the Workshop feared possible response to the show's political content. Dodds fought against the imposed indefinite delay, and the debate of censorship on such a sensitive issue at the time of the post-Iraq war debate became publicised by The New York Times. After a successful run in London's West End, the show eventually played to a sellout audience at the off-Broadway Minetta Lane Theatre in early 2006.

Television and film
Dodds has appeared in television shows such as Love in a Cold Climate (2001), the BBC series Spooks (in the U.S., MI-5; 2002-2004), and Viva Blackpool. Dodds was a part of the first series cast of the BBC One sitcom, Not Going Out in 2006 as Kate, the flatmate of the lead character Lee Mack, leaving the show after the first series.

Dodds portrayed  a "more conventionally beautiful" Marguerite as stepsister to Cinderella in Ever After (1998), a romance where Dodds' character is further described as "scarier than any ugly stepsisters that came before her, especially as it appears, briefly, that she has a legitimate shot at winning the prince".

Personal life
After relocating to England in 1997, Dodds met Oliver Pearce, fashion and advertising photographer. They later married and they have one child.

Filmography

Television

Stage

Film

Video games

References

Further reading

External links
 

Living people
Actresses from Sacramento, California
Juilliard School alumni
American film actresses
American stage actresses
American television actresses
American expatriate actresses in the United Kingdom
Year of birth missing (living people)